Matej Hradecky (born 17 April 1995) is a Finnish football player who plays for SJK.

Career

Club
On 16 February 2016, Hradecky signed a two-year contract with SJK. In February 2017, Hradecky was ruled out of the 2017 season through injury.

Personal life
Hradecky's brothers Lukáš Hrádecký and Tomáš Hradecký are also professional footballers.

Career statistics

International

Statistics accurate as of match played 13 January 2016

References

External links 
 
 Matej Hradecky at Palloliitto

1995 births
Living people
Finnish footballers
Finland international footballers
Finland youth international footballers
Association football midfielders
Finnish people of Slovak descent
Footballers from Turku
Seinäjoen Jalkapallokerho players
Åbo IFK players
Turun Palloseura footballers
HIFK Fotboll players
Veikkausliiga players
Ykkönen players
Kakkonen players
Finland under-21 international footballers